S.L.U. Arts and H. & P. Thakore Commerce College for Women  is a women's college in Ahmedabad in Gujarat state in India. Set up in 1920, the college offers undergraduate courses in arts and commerce streams. The college is affiliated to Gujarat University.

References

Universities and colleges in Ahmedabad
Women's universities and colleges in Gujarat
Gujarat University